Sik may refer to:
 Sik District, Kedah, Malaysia
 Sik (federal constituency), Dewan Rakyat, Malaysia
 Sik, Iran, a village
 Sik (roller coaster), an amusement park ride at Flamingo Land, United Kingdom
 Sik, South Khorasan, a village in Iran
 Sik (goat), nickname for Netherlands NS Class 200 locomotives

See also
 Sikh